Guduf-Gava (also known as Gudupe, Afkabiye) is an Afro-Asiatic language spoken in Borno State, Nigeria. In a 2006 paper, Roger Blench classified Cineni as a dialect.

Blench (2019) lists Cikide as a dialect of Guduf.

Notes

Biu-Mandara languages
Languages of Nigeria